Kolonia Zgorzelec (or simply Zgorzelec, German: Skorzeletz) is a workers' settlement (Polish: kolonia robotnicza) in Bytom, Poland.

Zgorzelec is composed of 34 familok buildings  and is registered on Poland's Registry of Objects of Cultural Heritage (Polish: Rejestr zabytków) from 1994. The settlement is located in south-western Łagiewniki, Bytom and is bordered by Szombierki (a district of Bytom) in the north, Ruda Śląska in the west and Świętochłowice in the south.

History
Zgorzelec was built from 1897 to 1901 on the initiative of Hubert von Tiele-Winckler to accommodate workers from the nearby Hubertushütte (Polish: Huta Hubertus, from 1936 Huta Zygmunt) steel mill on the order of the Kattowitz Joint-Stock Company for Mining and Ironworks.

References

Sources
"Kolonia Zgorzelec (podobszar 19)". bytomodnowa.pl. Retrieved October 6, 2020.
"Bytom: Kolonia Zgorzelec prawie jak na końcu świata". bytom.naszemiasto.pl. Retrieved October 6, 2020.
"Kolonia Zgorzelec w Bytomiu: będzie rewitalizacja!". dziennikzachodni.pl. Retrieved October 6, 2020.

Bytom
Neighbourhoods in Silesian Voivodeship